Capitán FAP José A. Quiñones González International Airport  is an airport serving Chiclayo, Peru and the surrounding metropolitan area. It is run by ADP a private airport operator that operates various airports in northern Peru. It is the main airport of the Lambayeque Region, one of the most populous regions of Peru.

The airport is also used by the Peruvian Air Force (FAP). It hosts one of the Air Force's two air superiority/interceptor squadrons, Escuadrón Aéreo 612 (Fighter Squadron 612 "Fighting Cocks"). The blast shelters housing the squadron's Mig 29 aircraft are visible from the airport runways.

The airport is named after Jose Quiñones Gonzalez, an FAP pilot who was killed during the Ecuadorian-Peruvian War of 1941.

Airlines and destinations

See also
Transport in Peru
List of airports in Peru

References

External links 
OurAirports - Chiclayo
SkyVector Aeronautical Charts

Airports in Peru
Buildings and structures in Chiclayo